Buemarinoa is a genus of armoured harvestmen in the family Cladonychiidae. There is one described species in Buemarinoa, B. patrizii, found in Sardinia, Italy.

References

Further reading

 
 
 

Harvestmen